The Monument to Cánovas del Castillo (Spanish: Monumento a Cánovas del Castillo) is an instance of public art located in Madrid, Spain. The monument consists of a bronze statue of Antonio Cánovas del Castillo by Joaquín Bilbao at the top of a pedestal designed by José Grases Riera that features additional sculptural elements by Bilbao.

History and description 
It was funded via popular subscription. It is located at the Plaza de la Marina Española, next to the Palace of the Senate.

Over the first course, it lies a body with 12 drawers decorated with ornamental plants, featuring some buttresses on its superior limit. In the middle body, there are two bronze sculptural groups placed in two ledges: on the front ledge there is a seated statue—History—writing the remarkable facts of the Cánovas' life in a book and a second standing statue—Glory—that leans with one hand on History and pulls with the other hand a laurel wreath touching the name of Cánovas, carved on the column emerging from the central body; on the back ledge there is a bronze trophy formed by a lion, the Spanish coat of arms and a flag. The truncated column is topped by a statue of Cánovas in an oratorical attitude, advancing his right arm while resting his left hand on a book placed on a pedestal.

It was inaugurated on 1 January 1901.

References 
Citations

Bibliography
 
 
 

Monuments and memorials in Madrid
Outdoor sculptures in Madrid
Sculptures of men in Spain
Statues of prime ministers
Buildings and structures in Palacio neighborhood, Madrid